is a motorway in western Germany.

Exit list 

 

|}

External links 

542
A542